Grand Lake Road is a community in the Canadian province of Nova Scotia, located in the Cape Breton Regional Municipality. The community is a retail service area of Cape Breton hosting the Mayflower Mall and several other outlets. Cape Breton University is also located in the community. The community was also home to 2 schools Lakevale and St. Augustine's Elementary which closed years ago.

References
 Grand Lake Road on Destination Nova Scotia

Communities in the Cape Breton Regional Municipality
General Service Areas in Nova Scotia